Pałka or Palka (meaning a stick in several Slavic languages) is a Polish surname that may refer to the following notable people: 
Daniel Palka (born 1991), American professional baseball outfielder 
Hermann Palka (1921–2004), Austrian bobsledder
Julian Pałka (1923–2002), Polish poster artist
Karina Lipiarska-Pałka (born 1987), Polish archer
Krystyna Guzik (née Pałka in 1983), Polish biathlete
Marianna Palka (born 1981), Scottish actress, producer, director, and writer

Polish-language surnames